Chantel is a French given name. It is a variant of Chantal.

People
Azaria Chantel Chamberlain (1980–1980), Australian 2-month old baby girl who was killed by a dingo near Uluru
Chantel Dubay, model
Chantel Emonson (born 1993), Australian rules footballer
Chantel Jeffries (born 1992), American DJ and model
Chantel Jones (born 1988), American former professional soccer player in the National Women's Soccer League
Chantel Malone (born 1991), athlete in the long jump and sprinting events, representing the British Virgin Islands
Chantel McGregor (born 1986), British blues rock guitarist and singer-songwriter from Bradford, England
Chantel Poirer (born 1985), Canadian former pair skater
Chantel Reid (born 1973), Singer 
Chantel Riley, Canadian-Jamaican actor
Chantel Tremitiere (born 1969), American former professional women's basketball player
Chantel Wolfenden (born 1986), OAM, Australian Paralympic swimmer
Chantel Woodhead (born 1974), former English international football player
Chantel Yiu (born 2006), Hong Kong singer and actress

Characters
 Chantel, a That's So Raven character and of The Cheetah Girls trilogy 
 Chantel Sauvé, a Degrassi character
 Lourdes Chantel, a Marvel Comics character
Chantel Frausier, supporting character of the cancelled series Cloak & Dagger
Chantel DuBois, main antagonist of Madagascar 3: Europe's Most Wanted

See also
Cantel (disambiguation)
Chantelle (disambiguation)
Chatel (disambiguation)